Ford Middle School may refer to:

Ford Middle School in Berea, Ohio
Ford Middle School in Allen, Texas

Other 
Fords Middle School in Woodbridge Township, New Jersey